Mel Brez (September 19, 1936 – November 18, 2020) was an American television soap opera writer.

Positions held

The Doctors
 Head Writer: October 3, 1977 - April 10, 1978 (with Ethel Brez)

Another World
 Script Writer: 1974, 1995

As the World Turns
 Co-Head Writer: 1997
 Associate Head Writer: 1997, 1998

Days of Our Lives
 Associate Head Writer: 1993 - 1994

One Life to Live
 Associate Head Writer: 1985 - 1992

Passions
 Associate Head Writer: 1999 - 2002

Awards and nominations
Daytime Emmy Award
Nomination, 2002, Best Writing, Passions
Nomination, 2001, Best Writing, Passions
Nomination, 1994, Best Writing, Days of our Lives
Nomination, 1992, Best Writing, One Life to Live
Nomination, 1990, Best Writing, One Life to Live
Win, 1987, Best Writing, One Life to Live

Writers Guild of America Award
Nomination, 2000, Best Writing, Passions
Nomination, 1998, Best Writing, As the World Turns
Nomination, 1997, Best Writing, As the World Turns
Nomination, 1993, Best Writing, Days of our Lives
Nomination, 1986, Best Writing, One Life to Live
Win, 1985, Best Writing, One Life to Live

Death
Brez died on 18 November 2020 at the age of 84.

References

External links

American soap opera writers
Writers Guild of America Award winners
1936 births
2020 deaths